Annemarie Rüegg (born 1 April 1958) is a Swiss former professional tennis player.

Rüegg competed in the Federation Cup for Switzerland from 1976 to 1978, then again in 1986. She helped Switzerland win a tie against Italy in 1977, with victories in her singles and doubles rubber.

In both 2002 and 2005 she had stints as Switzerland's Fed Cup captain.

See also
List of Switzerland Fed Cup team representatives

References

External links
 
 
 

1958 births
Living people
Swiss female tennis players
Swiss tennis coaches